Aldo Reschigna (born 6 April 1956) is an Italian politician who served as Mayor of Verbania (1993–2004), member of the Regional Council of Piedmont (2005–2019) and Vice President of Piedmont (2014–2019).

References

1956 births
Living people
Mayors of Verbania
20th-century Italian politicians
21st-century Italian politicians
Italian Communist Party politicians
Democratic Party of the Left politicians
Democrats of the Left politicians
Democratic Party (Italy) politicians
Members of the Regional Council of Piedmont
People from Verbania